José del Carmen (20 June 1917 – 21 April 1995) was a Colombian fencer. He competed in the individual sabre events at the 1956 Summer Olympics.

References

External links
 

1917 births
1995 deaths
Colombian male sabre fencers
Olympic fencers of Colombia
Fencers at the 1956 Summer Olympics
People from Cundinamarca Department
20th-century Colombian people